This is a list of Anglican churches that are notable as congregations or as church buildings or both.

The Anglican Communion is an international association of churches consisting of the Church of England and of national and regional Anglican churches (and a few other episcopal churches) in full communion with it There is no single "Anglican Church" with universal juridical authority as each national or regional church has full autonomy.  Some of these churches are known as Anglican, such as the Anglican Church of Canada, due to their historical link to England (Ecclesia Anglicana means "English Church"). Some, for example the Church of Ireland, the Scottish and American Episcopal churches, and some other associated churches have a separate name.

In the United States the Episcopal Church, also known formally as the "Protestant Episcopal Church in the United States of America", is the Anglican church; it separated from the Church of England following the American Revolution. In Scotland the Episcopal Church is also the name for the Anglican church.

Architect Richard Upjohn advocated the use of Carpenter Gothic style for rural Episcopalian churches in the United States through his 1852 pattern book Rural Architecture, and there are numerous examples.

There are numerous Methodist Episcopal churches which are not part of the Anglican church;  see List of Methodist churches for these.

in the United Kingdom

in England

East
Church of St Mary the Great, Cambridge
Chelmsford Cathedral
Ely Cathedral
Greensted Church
Holy Trinity Church, Long Melford
King's Lynn Minster
Norwich Cathedral
Peterborough Cathedral
St Albans Cathedral
St Helen's, Ranworth
St Mary's, East Bergholt
St Michael the Archangel, Framlingham
St Nicholas, Blakeney
St Peter and St Paul's Church, Lavenham
St Peter and St Paul's Church, Salle
St Peter Mancroft, Norwich
St Edmundsbury Cathedral
Wymondham Abbey

East Midlands
All Saints' Church, Northampton
Derby Cathedral
Lincoln Cathedral
St Andrew's Church, Sempringham
St Botolph's Church, Boston
St Mary the Virgin's Church, Bottesford
St Mary's Church, Nottingham
St Mary and All Saints, Chesterfield
St Wulfram's Church, Grantham
Southwell Minster

Leicester 

Cathedral Church of St Martin, Leicester
Holy Trinity Church, Leicester, Regent Road
St James the Greater, Leicester, London Road
St Margaret's Church, Leicester, St Margaret's Way

Church of St Mary de Castro, Leicester, Castle Yard
St Nicholas' Church, Leicester, St Nicholas Circle
St Peter's Church, Leicester, St Peter's Road

St Mark's Church, Leicester, Belgrave Gate, formerly a church, now "The Empire" Conference Centre
St Matthew's, Leicester, Montreal Road, formerly a church
St Paul's Church, Leicester, Kirby Road, formerly a church

St Saviour's Church, Leicester, St Saviour's Road

Greater London
All Hallows-by-the-Tower
All Saints, Margaret Street
All Souls Church, Langham Place
Christ Church Spitalfields
Croydon Minster
Guards Chapel, Wellington Barracks
Holy Trinity, Sloane Street
St Andrew's, Enfield
St Alfege Church, Greenwich
St Anne's Church, Kew
St Anne's, Limehouse
St Augustine's, Queen's Gate
St Bartholomew-the-Great
St Benet Paul's Wharf
St Botolph's Aldgate
St Bride's Church
St Clement Danes
St Cuthbert's, Earls Court
St Dunstan's, Stepney
St George the Martyr, Southwark
St George's, Hanover Square
St James's Church, Piccadilly
St John-at-Hampstead
St John's Wood Church
St Lawrence Jewry
St Margaret's Church, Westminster
St Mary Abbots
St Mary-le-Bow
St Mary le Strand
St Mary's Church, Battersea
St Mary's Church, Harrow on the Hill
St Martin-in-the-Fields
St Michael and All Angels, Bedford Park
St Paul's Cathedral
St. Paul's Church, Covent Garden
St Paul's, Deptford
St Peter's Church, Petersham
St Stephen Walbrook
Savoy Chapel
Southwark Cathedral
Westminster Abbey

North East
Durham Cathedral
Hexham Abbey
Newcastle Cathedral
Sunderland Minster

North West
Blackburn Cathedral
Bolton Abbey
Carlisle Cathedral
Chester Cathedral
Lancaster Priory
Liverpool Cathedral
Manchester Cathedral

South East
All Saints' Church, Hillesden
All Saints' Church, Wing
Canterbury Cathedral
Chichester Cathedral
Dorchester Abbey
Guildford Cathedral
Christ Church Cathedral, Oxford
Portsmouth Cathedral
Rochester Cathedral
St Augustine's Church, Brookland
St John the Baptist, Burford
St Giles' Church, Stoke Poges
St George's Chapel, Windsor Castle
St Lawrence's Church, West Wycombe
St Mary the Virgin, Oxford
St Mary the Virgin, Sompting
St Martin's Church, Canterbury
Winchester Cathedral

South West
Bath Abbey
Bristol Cathedral
Christchurch Priory
Exeter Cathedral
Gloucester Cathedral
St Andrew's Church, Mells
St John the Baptist, Cirencester
St Leonard's Church, Sheepstor
St Mary's Priory Church, Deerhurst
St Mary's Church, Fairford
St Mary's Church, Oare
St Michael and All Angels' Church, East Coker
St Pancras, Widecombe-in-the-Moor
Salisbury Cathedral
Sherborne Abbey
Tewkesbury Abbey
Truro Cathedral
Wells Cathedral
Wimborne Minster

West Midlands
St Philip's Cathedral, Birmingham
Coventry Cathedral
Hereford Cathedral
Lichfield Cathedral
Malvern Priory
St Mary and St David, Kilpeck
St Michael and All Angels, Great Witley
St Paul's Leamington Spa
Shrewsbury Abbey
Worcester Cathedral

Yorkshire
All Saints, Harlow Hill
Beverley Minster
Bradford Cathedral
Halifax Minster
Leeds Minster
Ripon Cathedral
Church of the Epiphany, Gipton
St George's Minster, Doncaster
St Gregory's Minster
St James' Church, Wetherby
St John the Divine, Calder Grove
St Mark's Church, Sheffield
St Mark, Old Leeds Road
St Mary's Church, Whitby
St Michael and all Angels, Beckwithshaw
St Robert's Church, Pannal
St Silas Church, Sheffield
St Thomas the Apostle, Killinghall
St Thomas, Thurstonland
Selby Abbey
Sheffield Cathedral
Wakefield Cathedral
York Minster

in Northern Ireland
Throughout Ireland, including the North, the term Church of Ireland is used.

St Patrick's Cathedral, Armagh
St Anne's Cathedral, Belfast
St George's Church, Belfast
St Columb's Cathedral, Derry
Down Cathedral
Drumcree Church

in Scotland
In Scotland the term Episcopal church is used.

St Andrew's Cathedral, Aberdeen
St Paul's Cathedral, Dundee
St Mary's Cathedral, Edinburgh
St Mary's Cathedral, Glasgow
Inverness Cathedral
Cathedral of The Isles
St John's Cathedral, Oban
St Ninian's Cathedral, Perth

in Wales
Bangor Cathedral
Brecon Cathedral
Llandaff Cathedral
Newport Cathedral
St Asaph Cathedral
St David's Cathedral

in Australia
St Peter's Cathedral, Adelaide
St John's Cathedral (Brisbane)
St David's Cathedral, Hobart
St Paul's Cathedral, Melbourne
St George's Cathedral, Perth
St Andrew's Cathedral, Sydney

in Canada
List of Anglican churches in Toronto
List of Anglican cathedrals in Canada
St. Paul's Church (Halifax)

in the Caribbean
Cathedral Church of St Michael and All Angels, Barbados
Holy Trinity Cathedral, Port of Spain
St Jaco de la Vega Cathedral, Spanish Town
St. George's Cathedral, Georgetown, Guyana

in Europe (including the Republic of Ireland)
Christ Church, Amsterdam
St. Olaf's Church, Balestrand
St George's Church, Barcelona
St. George's Anglican Church, Berlin
St Ursula's Church, Bern
Holy Trinity, Brussels
Anglican Church (Bucharest)
St. Alban's Church, Copenhagen
St Fin Barre's Cathedral, Cork
Christ Church Cathedral, Dublin
St Patrick's Cathedral, Dublin
St Mark's English Church, Florence
Holy Trinity Church, Geneva
Cathedral of the Holy Trinity, Gibraltar
Crimea Memorial Church, Istanbul
St Mary's Cathedral, Limerick
St. George's Church, Lisbon
St Paul's Cathedral, Lisbon
St George's Anglican Church, Madrid
Cathedral of the Redeemer, Madrid
St. Andrew's Anglican Church, Moscow
St. Edmund's Church, Oslo
Cathedral Church of the Holy Trinity, Paris
St. Saviour's Church, Riga
All Saints' Church, Rome
St Paul's Within the Walls, Rome
St Peter and St Sigfrid's Church, Stockholm
St Paul's Pro-Cathedral, Valletta
Church of the Holy Trinity, Sliema
St George's Church, Venice
Christ Church, Vienna
Church of St Augustine of Canterbury, Wiesbaden
Saint George's Memorial Church, Ypres

in India
 
All Saints Cathedral, Allahabad
All Saints Church (Secunderabad)
Diocese of Assam
Holy Trinity Cathedral, Palayamkottai
Holy Trinity Church, Bolarum
Holy Trinity Church, Yercaud
Medak Cathedral
St. Francis Church, Kochi
St. George's Cathedral, Chennai
St. James' Church, Delhi
St. John in the Wilderness
Millenium Methodist Church (Secunderabad)
St. John's Church, Secunderabad
St. Mary's Church, Chennai. First Anglican Church in India.
St. Thomas (SPG) Cathedral, Secunderabad
Wesley Church (Secunderabad)
St. John's Church, Meerut
St. Mary's Church, Chennai
St. Paul's Cathedral, Kolkata
St. Paul's Church, Landour
Thachanallur Pastorate
All Souls Church, Kanpur, Church of North India
Christ Church, Kanpur, Church of North India
Saint Pauls Church, Amritsar, Church of North India
Christ Church Cathedral, Amritsar, Church of North India
Church of Episcopal Fellowship International, CEFI Vellore, TN, India
St. Thomas Anglican Church, Saharanpur

in Israel
Christ Church, Jerusalem
St. George's Cathedral, Jerusalem

in Malaysia and Singapore
St. Mary's Cathedral, Kuala Lumpur
Christ Church, Malacca
St. George's Church, Penang
St Andrew's Cathedral, Singapore

in New Zealand
Holy Trinity Cathedral, Auckland
Saint Paul's Cathedral, Wellington
St James Church, Franz Josef
All Saints' Church, Hokitika

in the Philippines
The Philippine Independent Church, which split from the Roman Catholic church has been in full communion with the Episcopal Church in the United States, and through it, the entire Anglican Communion, since 1960.  One of its major churches is Iglesia Filipina Independiente National Cathedral.  See List of Philippine Independent Church churches.  There are also other Anglican churches in the Philippines such as the Episcopal Church in the Philippines and the Anglican Church in the Philippines (Traditional) Inc.

in Nigeria
Cathedral Church of Christ, Lagos
St. Matthews Anglican Church, Abuja
All Saints Anglican Church, Abuja
St. Barnabas Anglican Church, Port Harcourt
St. Paul's Cathedral, Port Harcourt

in South Africa
St. George's Cathedral, Cape Town
St. Joseph's Church, Bishop Lavis Town
St Mary's Cathedral, Johannesburg

in South Georgia
Norwegian Anglican Church, Grytviken

in Taiwan
Church of the Good Shepherd (Taipei)
St. John's Episcopal Cathedral, Taipei

in the United States
In the United States, the term Episcopal church is used.  This section provides a List of Episcopal churches in the United States.  See also List of the Episcopal cathedrals of the United States.

Organized (by state then city), with separate lists of historic Maryland parishes at end

List of the original 30 Anglican parishes in the Province of Maryland
List of post-1692 Anglican parishes in the Province of Maryland

Former Anglican churches in China
Holy Saviour's Cathedral (Beijing)
Trinity Church, Changsha
St John's Church, Chengdu
Anglican Church, Dalian
St. John's Church, Fuzhou
Gospel Church, Guanghan
Shamian Church, Guangzhou
Gospel Church, Jiangyou
St John's Cathedral, Langzhong
Trinity Church, Langzhong
Gospel Church, Mianyang
Gospel Church, Mianzhu
St. Paul's Church, Nanjing
Holy Trinity Church, Shanghai
All Saints' Church, Tianjin
Gospel Church, Wanzhou
Holy Cross Church, Wuxi

See also
List of Anglo-Catholic churches
List of Anglican churches in Hong Kong
List of Anglican churches in Macau
List of Anglican churches in Melbourne
List of Anglican churches in the Diocese of Sydney
List of Anglican churches in Toronto
List of Anglican cathedrals in Canada

References

Anglican